Harzburg may refer to various places in Germany:
 Harzburg, a former imperial castle (Kaiserburg) in the Harz
 Bad Harzburg, a town in Goslar District in Lower Saxony
 Herzburg, a former fort near Altenkirchen in the Westerwald

See also
 Harzburg Front
 Hartsburg (disambiguation)